The 1956–57 Sussex County Football League season was the 32nd in the history of the competition.

Division 1 was reduced to sixteen teams as Eastbourne United left the league and Rye United being promoted from Division 2. Division 2 now featured fifteen teams from which the winner would be promoted into Division 1.

Division One
The division featured 16 clubs, 15 which competed in the last season, along with one new club:
Rye United, promoted from last season's Division Two

Hove White Rovers changed name to Hove Town.

League table

Division Two
The division featured 15 clubs, 12 which competed in the last season, along with three new clubs:
Three Bridges United, relegated from last season's Division One
Brighton North End
Old Varndeanians

League table

References

1956-57
9